The 19th Genie Awards were held on February 4, 1999 to honour Canadian films released in 1998. It marked only the second time in the 1990s, after the 16th Genie Awards in January 1996, that the awards were held in the winter of the year following the year in which eligible films were released, rather than the late fall of the same year; the awards have subsequently retained the winter scheduling since 1999.

The ceremony was held at the Living Arts Centre in Mississauga, Ontario. Actor Albert Schultz hosted the ceremony.

Last Night and Such a Long Journey were tied for the most nominations, with 12 nods each. However, The Red Violin won the most awards, with eight wins including Best Picture.

Nominees and winners

References

External links 
Genie Awards 1999 on imdb 

19
Genie
Genie